Carbondale is an unincorporated community and coal town  in Fayette County, West Virginia, United States.

The community most likely was named for the production of coal, a carbon-based fuel.

References 

Unincorporated communities in West Virginia
Unincorporated communities in Fayette County, West Virginia
Coal towns in West Virginia